View from Masada is the second studio album by the rapper Killah Priest, released in 2000. The Enhanced CD portion contains a video of "What Part of the Game?", with Ras Kass.

The album peaked at No. 73 on the Billboard 200.

Production
Despite his affiliation with the Wu-Tang Clan, none of its members appear on the album. View from Masada was produced principally by Wiz and Just Blaze.

Critical reception
Exclaim! wrote: "Now trying to mesh his spiritual allusions with party-rocking lyrics, Killah Priest predictably fails to do either very well." The Hartford Courant deemed the album "an eclectic reflection of the everyday battle between heaven and hell." The Boston Herald thought that "Priest confuses matters on View From Masada, adopting a part-time gangsta persona that allows him to play both sides of the street in a way that seems cynical, given his previous street-tough idealism."

Track listing

Album singles

References

2000 albums
Killah Priest albums
MCA Records albums
Albums produced by Just Blaze